Chah Narenj or Chahnarenj may refer to:
 Chah Narenj, Faryab
 Chahnarenj, Manujan